Supima is a non-profit trade association in the United States whose main objective is to promote the use of U.S. grown American Pima cotton around the world and is involved in quality assurance and research programs. Founded in 1954, it derived its name from superior pima.

Supima licenses about 600 selected high-quality mills, textile and clothing manufacturers, and brands/retailers to use the SUPIMA® trademark. Members finance the activities of Supima by payments calculated on a "per bale" basis.

Its other activities include:
research programs to improve the quality of American Pima cotton
timely crop and market information to its grower-members and licensees
advertisements in both consumer and trade publications
presentations to customers both in the USA and abroad
participation in major international exhibitions and events
an annual design competition featuring top graduates from the leading U.S. fashion and design schools that is showcased during New York Fashion Week in September

The Board of Directors of Supima is made up of American Pima growers from Arizona, California, New Mexico, and Texas.

Production of Supima cotton has risen from about 100,000 bales per year in the 1980s to over 800,000 bales in 2006. More than 90% of Supima cotton is exported from the United States, the majority of this being for the overseas manufacture of yarn, finished fabrics, clothing, sheets and towels which are re-exported to the United States for sale. The top five importers of Supima cotton are China, India, Pakistan, Turkey, and Peru.

References

External links
Main Website

Cotton industry in the United States
Agriculture in the United States
Fashion organizations
Non-profit organizations based in the United States